Epinotia tianshanensis is a species of moth of the family Tortricidae. It is found in Xinjiang, China.

The larvae feed on Picea schrenkiana.

References

Moths described in 1993
Eucosmini